Hot Country Songs is a chart that ranks the top-performing country music songs in the United States, published by Billboard magazine.  In 2010, 29 different songs topped the chart in 52 issues of the magazine, based on weekly airplay data from country music radio stations compiled by Nielsen Broadcast Data Systems.

In the first issue of the new year, Reba McEntire reached number one with "Consider Me Gone", replacing "Need You Now" by Lady Antebellum, which had been number one since the issue dated November 28, 2009.  With this release, for which the singer was credited only as Reba, McEntire gained the longest-running chart-topper of her career, and achieved the feat of having topped the chart in four different decades, having first reached number one in 1983 with "Can't Even Get the Blues". "Consider Me Gone" was one of three songs to tie for the longest run at the top of the chart in 2010, along with "Why Don't We Just Dance" by Josh Turner and "The House That Built Me" by Miranda Lambert; all three spent four weeks in the top spot.

Seven acts achieved more than one number-one hit during the year.  Easton Corbin, Billy Currington, Lady Antebellum, Brad Paisley, Blake Shelton and Josh Turner each reached the top with two different songs.  Turner's total of five weeks at the top was the most by any act.  Zac Brown Band was the only act to place three songs at the top of the chart, with "Highway 20 Ride" in April, "Free" in August and "As She's Walking Away", featuring Alan Jackson, in November.  Five acts achieved their first number-one hits in 2010: Easton Corbin, Miranda Lambert, Luke Bryan, Jerrod Niemann and The Band Perry.

Chart history

See also
2010 in music
List of artists who reached number one on the U.S. country chart

References

2010
United States Country Singles
Number-one country singles